Soresina is a comune (municipality) in the Province of Cremona in the Italian region Lombardy, located about  southeast of Milan and about  northwest of Cremona.

It received the honorary title of city with a presidential decree on October 27, 1962.

Soresina borders the following municipalities: Annicco, Cappella Cantone, Casalmorano, Castelleone, Cumignano sul Naviglio, Genivolta, Trigolo.

Transportation 
Soresina has a railway station on the Treviglio–Cremona line.

References

External links 
 
Photos of Soresina

Cities and towns in Lombardy